ROKS Gimcheon (PCC-761) was a  of the Republic of Korea Navy and later transferred to Vietnam People's Navy as HQ-18.

Development and design 

The Pohang class is a series of corvettes built by different Korean shipbuilding companies. The class consists of 24 ships and some after decommissioning were sold or given to other countries. There are five different types of designs in the class from Flight II to Flight VI.

Construction and career 
Gimcheon was launched on 29 November 1985 by Hanjin Heavy Industries in Busan. The vessel was commissioned on 1 September 1986 and decommissioned 31 December 2015. She was transferred to the Vietnam People's Navy. She arrived on 7 June 2017 with a new name HQ-18.

On 10 September 2019, HQ-18 and  participated in AUM X 2019. Darulaman sailed from Brunei to meet HQ-18 off Hon Khoai Island.

Gallery

References
 

Ships built by Hanjin Heavy Industries
Pohang-class corvettes
1985 ships
Corvettes of the Vietnam People's Navy